Frederik Jacobus Badenhorst is a South African politician who has served in the National Council of Provinces as a Western Cape permanent delegate for the Democratic Alliance since December 2022. He was previously the ward councillor for ward 21 and a Member of the Mayoral Committee in the Stellenbosch Local Municipality.

References

External links
Profile at Parliament of South Africa

Living people
Afrikaner people
People from the Western Cape
Members of the National Assembly of South Africa